The Australian Defence Organisation (ADO) is composed of the armed forces of the Commonwealth of Australia, the Australian Defence Force (ADF), and the Australian Public Service government department, the Department of Defence which is composed of a range of civilian support organisations.

The Chief of the Defence Force (CDF) leads the Australian Defence Force and the Secretary of Defence leads the Department of Defence though both jointly manage the Australian Defence Organisation under a diarchy, and both report directly to the Minister for Defence.

The highest active rank in the Australian Defence Force is reserved for the Chief of the Defence Force. This is a four-star rank and the CDF is the only Australian military officer at that level. As a result of the diarchy, the Secretary of the Department of Defence is of the equivalent civilian four-starlevel in the Senior Executive Service of the Australian Public Service.

Command and Control 
The Commander-in-Chief of the Australian Defence Force is set out under Section 68 of the Constitution of Australia, stating "the command in chief of the naval and military forces of the Commonwealth is vested in the Governor-General as the Queen's representative". In practice, the Governor-General is the ceremonial head of the Australian Defence Force and command and control power is delegated to the Prime Minister and the Minister for Defence. The National Security Committee of Cabinet also plays an important role in the strategic direction of the Australian Defence Organisation including directing overseas deployments and going to war.

Five-star level 
Currently the five-star level is not an active serving rank in the Australian Defence Force. The first holder of this rank was William Birdwood, who was appointed as Field Marshal on 20 March 1925. George VI was appointed Marshal of the Royal Australian Air Force, maintaining the rank from 2 June 1939 until his death on 6 February 1952. Also, Prince Philip maintains the ranks of Field Marshal, Admiral of the Fleet, and Marshal of the Royal Australian Air Force. He was appointed to each rank on 2 April 1954. Australia has only had one active serving five-star rank officer within the armed forces of the Commonwealth of Australia, Thomas Blamey, who was appointed Field Marshal in the Australian Army in June 1950. He was presented his field marshal's baton by the then Governor-General William McKell in hospital that September, and Blamey, who was seriously ill at the time, died in May 1951.

Four-star level 
In the Australian Defence Force, guided by the Defence Force Regulations 1952, the level of four-star rank is that of commissioned officer O-10 in the Australian Defence Force ranks code. This means the Australian Army rank of general, the Royal Australian Navy rank of admiral, and the Royal Australian Air Force rank of air chief marshal.

In the Australian Public Service, guided by the Public Service Act 1999, the level of four-star rank is the equivalent civilian level of Senior Executive Service Band 4, which is styled as secretary with the leadership of a department.

 Chief of the Defence Force (CDF)
 Secretary of Defence (SECDEF)
 Director-General of the Australian Signals Directorate (DGASD)

Three-star level 
In the Australian Defence Force, guided by the Defence Force Regulations 1952, the level of three-star rank is that of commissioned officer O-9 in the Australian Defence Force ranks code. This means the Australian Army rank of lieutenant general, the Royal Australian Navy rank of vice admiral, and the Royal Australian Air Force rank of air marshal.

In the Australian Public Service, guided by the Public Service Act 1999, the level of three-star rank is the equivalent civilian level of Senior Executive Service Band 3, which is styled as associate secretary or deputy secretary (DEPSEC) or a chief portfolio officer, with the leadership of a group or agency.

Australian Defence Force 
 Vice Chief of the Defence Force (VCDF)
 Chief of Navy (CN)
 Chief of Army (CA)
 Chief of Air Force (CAF)
 Chief of Joint Operations (CJOPS) 
 Chief of Joint Capabilities (CJC)
 Chief of Defence Intelligence (CDI)

Department of Defence 
 Associate Secretary of the Department of Defence
 Deputy Secretary for Strategy, Policy and Industry 
 Deputy Secretary for Capability Acquisition and Sustainment 
 Deputy Secretary for National Naval Shipbuilding 
 Deputy Secretary for People 
 Deputy Secretary for National Naval Shipbuilding
  Deputy Secretary for Security and Estate 
 Chief Finance Officer 
 Chief Information Officer 
 Chief Defence Scientist
 Chief, Nuclear-Powered Submarine Task Force

Australian Signals Directorate 
 Deputy Director-General for SIGINT and Effects
 Deputy Director-General for Capability and Transformation
 Head of the Australian Cyber Security Centre
 Chief Operating Officer

Two-star level 
In the Australian Defence Force, guided by the Defence Force Regulations 1952, the level of two-star rank is that of commissioned officer O-8 in the Australian Defence Force ranks code. This means the Australian Army rank of major general, the Royal Australian Navy rank of rear admiral, and the Royal Australian Air Force rank of air vice marshal.

In the Australian Public Service, guided by the Public Service Act 1999, the level of two-star rank is the equivalent civilian level of Senior Executive Service Band 2 which is styled as First Assistant Secretary (FAS), general manager, chief or head with the leadership of a division or agency.

Vice Chief of the Defence Force Group 
 Head of Force Design
 Head of Force Integration
 Head of Military Strategic Planning
 Head of Military Strategic Commitments
 Head of Summary Discipline Implementation

Joint Capabilities Group 
 Deputy Chief of Joint Capabilities and Head of Information Warfare
 Commander of the Australian Defence College
 Commander of the Joint Logistics Command 
 Commander Joint Health Command and Surgeon General
 Executive Director of the Australian Civil-Military Centre
 Head of the Reserve and Youth Division and Commander of the Australian Defence Force Cadets

United States Army Pacific 
 Deputy Commanding General – North of the United States Army Pacific

Capability Acquisition and Sustainment Group 
 Head of Joint Systems 
 Head of Maritime Systems 
 General Manager for Submarines
 Head of Future Submarine Program
 General Manager for Ships
 Head of Land Systems
 Head of Helicopter Systems
 Head of Aerospace Systems
 Head of Joint Strike Fighter Program
 General Counsel and First Assistant Secretary for Commercial
 First Assistant Secretary for Program Performance
 Group Business Manager
 Chief Finance Officer

Strategic Policy and Intelligence Group 
 Head of the Australian Defence Staff, Washington DC
 Military Representative to the North Atlantic Treaty Organization and the European Union
 Director of the Defence Intelligence Organisation (DIO)
 Director of the Australian Geospatial-Intelligence Organisation (AGO)
 First Assistant Secretary for International Policy 
 First Assistant Secretary for Strategic Policy 
 First Assistant Secretary for Defence Industry Policy

Australian Signals Directorate 
 First Assistant Director-General (Network Operations and Access)
 First Assistant Director-General (Corporate)
 First Assistant Director-General (Strategic Communications)
 First Assistant Director-General (Protect, Assure and Enable)
 First Assistant Director-General (Intelligence)
 First Assistant Director-General (General Counsel)
 First Assistant Director-General (Capability)
 First Assistant Director General (Engagement, Operations and Intelligence)

Australian Army 
 Deputy Chief of Army (DCA)
 Commander of the Forces Command (CFC)
 Head of Land Capability
 Special Operations Commander Australia
 Commander of the 1st Division (Deployable Joint Forces Headquarters)
 Commander of the 2nd Division

Joint Operations Command 
 Commander of the Maritime Border Command
 Deputy Chief of Joint Operations (DCJOPS)
 Commander of the Joint Task Force 633 (Middle East Area of Operations)

Royal Australian Navy 
 Deputy Chief of Navy (DCN) and Head of Navy People, Training and Resources
 Commander Australian Fleet (COMAUSFLT)
 Head of Navy Capability
 Head of Navy Engineering

Royal Australian Air Force 
 Deputy Chief of Air Force (DCAF)
 Air Commander Australia (ACAUST)

Defence Science and Technology Group 
 Deputy Chief Defence Scientist for Research Services
 Chief of Science Strategy and Program 
 Chief of Science Partnerships and Engagement
 Chief of Research Services
 Chief of Maritime
 Chief of Land
 Chief of Aerospace
 Chief of Joint and Operations Analysis
 Chief of National Security and Intelligence, Surveillance and Reconnaissance
 Chief of Cyber and Electronic Warfare
 Chief of Weapons and Combat Systems
 Chief Technology Officer for National Security

Chief Information Officer Group 
 Chief Technology Officer
 Head of ICT Operations
 Head of ICT Delivery
 Head of Infrastructure Transformation Program

Defence People Group 
 First Assistant Secretary for People Capability
 First Assistant Secretary for People Policy and Culture
 First Assistant Secretary for People Services

Defence Security and Estate Group 
 First Assistant Secretary for Service Delivery
 First Assistant Secretary for Infrastructure

Chief Finance Officer Group 
 First Assistant Secretary for Financial Services
 First Assistant Secretary for Resource and Assurance

Associate Secretary Group 
 First Assistant Secretary for Ministerial and Executive Coordination and Communication
 First Assistant Secretary for Governance and Reform
 First Assistant Secretary for Audit and Fraud Control
 First Assistant Secretary for Security and Vetting Service
 Inspector General
 Judge Advocate General (JAG)
 Chief Judge Advocate
 Head of Defence Legal
 Program Manager of Enterprise Resource Planning

United Nations 
 Force Commander of the United Nations Peacekeeping Force in Cyprus

One-star level 
In the Australian Defence Force, guided by the Defence Force Regulations 1952, the level of one-star rank is that of commissioned officer O-7 in the Australian Defence Force ranks code. This means the Australian Army rank of brigadier, the Royal Australian Navy rank of commodore, and the Royal Australian Air Force rank of air commodore.

In the Australian Public Service, guided by the Public Service Act 1999, the level of one-star rank is the equivalent civilian level of Senior Executive Service Band 1 which is styled as Assistant Secretary (AS) or director-general with the leadership of a branch.

Office of the Chief of the Defence Force 
 Liaison Officer to the Chairman of the United States Joint Chiefs of Staff

Vice Chief of the Defence Force Group 
 Director General of Joint Force Analysis
 Deputy Director of the Australian Civil-Military Centre
 Director General of Military Information Effects
 Director General of Military Strategic Commitments
 Head of the Centenary of ANZAC Planning Team
 Director General of Command, Control, Communications, Computers, and Intelligence and Training Support
 Commander of the Joint Counter Improvised Threats Task Force

Australian Signals Directorate 
 Commander of the Defence SIGINT and Cyber Command

Joint Capabilities Group 
 Principal of the Centre for Defence and Strategic Studies
 Commandant of the Australian Defence Force Academy
 Principal of the Australian Command and Staff College
 Director General of C4I and Training Support
 Director General of Capability Integration Test and Evaluation
 Director General of Capability Workstream
 Director General of Joint Counter Improvised Threats Task Force
 Director General of Joint Information Environment Warfare
 Chief of Staff and Executive Director of Corporate Management of the Joint Logistics Command
 Director General of Explosive Ordnance
 Director General of Fuel Services
 Director General of Logistics Assurance
 Director General of Logistics Systems
 Director General of Strategic Logistics
 Director General of Supply Chain
 Director General of Garrison Health Operations
 Director General of Health Capability
 Director General of Mental Health, Psychology and Rehabilitation
 Director General of Strategic Health Coordination

Capability Acquisition and Sustainment Group 
 Assistant Secretary for Intelligence, Surveillance, Reconnaissance and Electronic Warfare
 Assistant Secretary for Critical Systems
 Assistant Secretary for Communication Systems
 Assistant Secretary for Air and Space Surveillance Control
 Assistant Secretary for Explosive Materiel
 Assistant Secretary for Major Surface Ships
 Assistant Secretary for Specialist Ship
 Assistant Secretary for Maritime Support
 Assistant Secretary for Integrated Soldier Systems
 Assistant Secretary for Land Manoeuvre Systems
 Assistant Secretary for Land Vehicle Systems
 Assistant Secretary for Combined Arms Fighting System
 Assistant Secretary for Land Engineering Agency
 Assistant Secretary for Commodity Reform Program
 Assistant Secretary for Army Aviation Systems
 Assistant Secretary for Navy Aviation Systems
 Assistant Secretary for Airlift and Tanker Systems
 Assistant Secretary for Aerospace Combat Systems
 Assistant Secretary for Aerospace Maritime, Training and Surveillance
 Assistant Secretary for Governance and Management
 Assistant Secretary for Acquisition and Sustainment Policy
 Assistant Secretary for Program Management
 Assistant Secretary for Disposals and Sales

Strategic Policy and Intelligence Group 
 Deputy Director of the Australian Geospatial-Intelligence Organisation
 Deputy Director of the Defence Intelligence Organisation
 Assistant Secretary for Arms Control
 Assistant Secretary for Military Strategy
 Assistant Secretary for Strategic Policy
 Assistant Secretary for Intelligence Policy Integration
 Assistant Secretary for Global Interests
 Assistant Secretary for Major Powers
 Assistant Secretary for Pacific and Timor-Leste
 Assistant Secretary for South East Asia
 Assistant Secretary for Defence Industry
 Assistant Secretary for Defence Export Controls
 Assistant Secretary for Defence Capability and Innovation
 Head of the Australian Defence Staff in London
 Head of the Australian Defence Staff in Jakarta
 Air Force Attache of the Australian Defence Staff in Washington DC
 Military Attache of the Australian Defence Staff in Washington DC
 Naval Attache of the Australian Defence Staff in Washington DC

Australian Army 
 Commanding Officer of the 1st Brigade
 Commanding Officer of the 3rd Brigade
 Commanding Officer of the 6th Brigade
 Commanding Officer of the 7th Brigade
 Commanding Officer of the 16th Aviation Brigade
 Commanding Officer of the 17th Sustainment Brigade
 Commanding Officer of the 4th Brigade
 Commanding Officer of the 5th Brigade
 Commanding Officer of the 8th Brigade
 Commanding Officer of the 9th Brigade
 Commanding Officer of the 11th Brigade
 Commanding Officer of the 13th Brigade
 Commandant of the Royal Military College, Duntroon
 Director-General of Future Land Warfare
 Director-General of Development and Plans
 Director-General of Reserves
 Commander - Australian Army Cadets

Joint Operations Command 
 Commander of the Northern Command
 Commander of Task Group Afghanistan
 Commander of the Australian Air Task Group in Iraq
 Chief of Staff

Royal Australian Navy

Strategic Command 
 Chief of Staff of the Strategic Command
 Australian Hydrographer
 Director-General of Capability Plans and Engagement
 Director-General of Navy Business and Governance
 Director-General of Navy Capability Transition and Sustainment
 Director-General of Navy Communications and Coordination
 Director-General of Navy Communications and Information Warfare
 Director-General of Navy Submarine Capability
 Navy Scientific Adviser
 Director-General of Australian Navy Cadets and Reserves
 Director-General of Chaplaincy
 Director-General of Navy Certification and Safety
 Director-General of Navy Health Services / Director-General of Navy Health Reserves
 Director-General of Navy People
 Commodore of Training

Fleet Command 
 Director-General of Maritime Operations
 Chief of Staff of the Fleet Command
 Commander of the Fleet Air Arm
 Commander of the Surface Force
 Commodore of the Shore Force
 Commodore of Warfare
 Commander of the Information Warfare Force

Royal Australian Air Force 
Director-General of Strategy and Planning
Director-General of Capability Planning
Director-General of Personnel
Director-General of Reserves
Director-General of Logistics
Commander of the Air Warfare Centre

Defence Science and Technology Group

Chief Information Officer Group

Defence People Group 
 Assistant Secretary for Human Resources Services
 Assistant Secretary for Pay and Administration
 Assistant Secretary for Work Health and Safety
 Assistant Secretary for Culture and People Development
 Assistant Secretary for Defence Learning
 Assistant Secretary for People Policy and Employment Conditions
 Assistant Secretary for Workforce Planning
 Director General of Defence Force Recruiting
 Director General of the Defence Community Organisation
 Director General of Project Suakin

Defence Security and Estate  Group 
 Assistant Secretary for Capital Facilities and Infrastructure
 Assistant Secretary for Environment and Engineering
 Assistant Secretary for Estate Planning
 Assistant Secretary for Property Management
 Assistant Secretary for Regional Services
 Assistant Secretary for Estate Service Delivery
 Assistant Secretary for Service Delivery Program Management and Governance
 Director General of Base Planning Engagement and Service Performance

Chief Finance Officer Group 
 Assistant Secretary for Finance Business Information
 Assistant Secretary for Costing and Coordination
 Assistant Secretary for Financial Coordination

Associate Secretary Group 
 Assistant Secretary for Fraud Control and Investigations
 Assistant Secretary for Audit
 Assistant Secretary for Security Operations
 Assistant Secretary for Security Policy and Plans
 Assistant Secretary for Vetting
 Assistant Secretary for Enterprise Governance
 Assistant Secretary for Enterprise Reform
 Assistant Secretary for Information Management and Access
 Assistant Secretary for Communication
 Assistant Secretary for Ministerial and Parliamentary
 Deputy Judge Advocate General - Army
 Deputy Judge Advocate General - Navy
 Deputy Judge Advocate General - Air Force
 Director of Military Prosecutions
 Deputy Inspector-General of the Australian Defence Force
 Defence General Counsel
 Defence Special Counsel
 Director General of Australian Defence Force Legal Services
 Program Manager of the United States Force Posture Initiatives and Singapore Joint Development Implementation

References and notes

See also
Current senior Australian Defence Organisation personnel

External links
Defence leaders: high profile senior personnel

Leadership of the Australian Defence Force
Military of Australia
Australian Defence Force